Madeira High School is a public high school in Madeira, Ohio, a bedroom community near Cincinnati, Ohio. Madeira High School is the only high school in the Madeira City Schools District.

Academics
MHS is known for academic excellence, which has been recognized by U.S. News & World Report; in 2015, the publishing company ranked MHS 13th in the State of Ohio and 282nd in the nation.  With a 75 percent student body participation in Advanced Placement Exams, MHS's students have an overall AP Exam pass rate of 81 percent.

Student life
Madeira's Latin Club, the Madeira Junior Classical League, functions as a local chapter of both the Ohio Junior Classical League (OJCL) and the National Junior Classical League (NJCL).  In 2010, Madeira placed second in the Overall Club Sweepstakes at OJCL State Convention and third place in both the 2012 and 2013 State Conventions.  Other clubs and activities active at MHS are Art Club, Academic Team, Chess Club, Madeira Marching Mustangs, Madeira Theatre Arts, Student Government, and Unified for Uganda.

What's Up Madeira? is a weekly student-run video news series popular amongst students.  School announcements, upcoming events, student and teacher  interviews, and a weather report are typically featured in each video.

Athletics
Madeira is a member of the Cincinnati Hills League (CHL). The Mustangs and Amazons have had success at both the league level and the state level. The school has a strong rivalry with the  Mariemont Warriors.

Ohio High School Athletic Association championships

 Girls Volleyball – 1978
 Boys Baseball – 1999
 Boys Soccer – 2002, 2003
 Girls Soccer – 2010

Notable alumni
 Eli Maiman, 2004, guitarist for Walk the Moon
 Andrew Benintendi, 2013, former player for the Arkansas Razorbacks baseball team, outfielder for the New York Yankees
 John McNally, 2017, tennis player at Ohio State University
 Caty McNally, 2020, professional tennis player

References

External links
 District Web site

High schools in Hamilton County, Ohio
Public high schools in Ohio